Blue, White and Red Rally is a French nationalist political association in France founded by Jean-Marie Le Pen.

History
The family feud between expelled French National Front founder Jean-Marie Le Pen and Marine Le Pen, his daughter, deepened on 5 September 2015 when he launched the rival right-wing party. Mr. Le Pen, 87, who was expelled from the FN in August 2015, told supporters in the city: 'You will not be orphans. We can act in a similar way to the FN, even if we are not part of it.'

Marine Le Pen, the  leader of the Front National remarked 'He does what he wants, he is a free man.' The row with her father erupted in April 2014, when he defended comments he had made in the past about how the Nazi gas chambers of the Second World War were a 'detail' of history. Ms. Le Pen, who succeeded her father as leader in 2011, dismissed his move. Mr. Le Pen was stripped of his FN membership by the party's executive committee in August following a damaging five-month family feud with his daughter over a string of inflammatory comments. He dismissed the hearing as a 'mockery' and an 'ambush' and blamed Ms. Le Pen, who took over from him as leader in 2011, of pulling the strings from afar. 'It's dirty to kill your own daddy, so she didn't kill daddy directly, she did it through her henchman,' Mr. Le Pen told French radio at the time. The elder Le Pen has been a persistent problem for his daughter as she tries to smooth over the overt racism and xenophobia of the party's past. The final straw came in April when he rehashed familiar comments about the gas chambers and said France should get along with Russia to save the 'white world'. Ms. Le Pen then openly split with her father, saying he was committing 'political suicide'. But he vowed to 'reconquer' the party he founded in 1972.

He  confirmed he would support his granddaughter Marion Maréchal-Le Pen for the next regional elections and that he wanted to influence the National Front's ideology with his association. He also praised Marine Le Pen's speech in Marseille on 6 September 2015, describing it as "lepéniste".

References

2015 establishments in France
Anti-communism in France
Anti-immigration politics in Europe
Far-right political parties in France
Far-right politics in France
French nationalist parties
Jean-Marie Le Pen
Political history of France
Political parties established in 2015
Political parties of the French Fifth Republic